Octochaetidae is a family of annelids belonging to the order Haplotaxida.

Genera
Genera:

 Agastrodrilus Omodeo & Vaillaud, 1967
 Bahlia Gates, 1945
 Benhamia Michaelsen, 1889
 Benhamiona Csuzdi & Zicsi, 1994
 Calebiella Gates, 1945
 Celeriella Gates, 1958
 Dashiella Julka, 1988
 Dichogaster Beddard, 1888
 Erythraeodrilus Stephenson, 1915
 Eudichogaster Michaelsen, 1902
 Eutrigaster Cognetti, 1904
 Eutyphoeus Michaelsen, 1900
 Guineoscolex Csuzdi & Zicsi, 1994
 Herbettodrilus Julka, Blanchart & Chapuis-Lardy, 2004
 Hoplochaetella Michaelsen, 1900
 Karmiella Julka, 1983
 Konkadrilus Julka, 1988
 Kotegeharia Julka, 1988
 Lennogaster Gates, 1939
 Mallehulla Julka, 1982
 Millsonia Beddard, 1894
 Monothecodrilus Csuzdi & Zicsi, 1994
 Neogaster Černosvitov, 1934
 Octochaetoides Michaelsen, 1922
 Octochaetus Beddard, 1893
 Omodeona Sims, 1967
 Pellogaster Gates, 1939
 Pickfordia Omodeo, 1958
 Priodoscolex Gates, 1940
 Ramiella Stephenson, 1921
 Ramiellona Michaelsen, 1935
 Rillogaster Gates, 1939
 Senapatiella Julka, Blanchart & Chapuis-Lardy, 2004
 Shimodrilus Julka, Blanchart & Chapuis-Lardy, 2004
 Trigaster Benham, 1886
 Wahoscolex Julka, 1988
 Wegeneriella Michaelsen, 1933
 Wegeneriona Černosvitov, 1939

References

Haplotaxida